Midnight Madness is a 1928 silent film drama directed by F. Harmon Weight and starring Jacqueline Logan. It was produced by Cecil B. DeMille's DeMille Pictures Corporation and released through Pathé Exchange.

Prints are preserved at the Museum of Modern Art, Library of Congress and New Zealand Film Archive. A video of the preserved film is available for viewing at the website of the National Film Preservation Foundation.

Cast
Jacqueline Logan - Norma Forbes
Clive Brook - Richard Bream
Walter McGrail - Arthur Childers
James Bradbury - John Forbes
Oscar Smith - Manubo
Vadim Uraneff - Joe
Louis Natheaux - Masher
Clarence Burton - A sailor
Virginia Sale - The Gargoyle
Frank Hagney - Harris
Emmett King - Robert Strong
Sidney Bracey - Bream's Valet (*uncredited)
Broderick O'Farrell - Bream's friend at Café (*uncredited)

References

External links
Midnight Madness @ IMDb.com
Midnight Madness (1928) [Video of the complete preserved film]

1928 films
American silent feature films
American films based on plays
1928 drama films
American black-and-white films
Pathé Exchange films
Silent American drama films
Films directed by F. Harmon Weight
Surviving American silent films
1920s American films